HMS Tyler (K576) was a British Captain-class frigate of the Royal Navy in commission during World War II. Originally constructed as a United States Navy Buckley-class destroyer escort, she served in the Royal Navy from 1944 to 1945.

Construction and transfer
Allocated to the United Kingdom on 10 June 1943, the ship was laid down as the unnamed U.S. Navy destroyer escort DE-567 by Bethlehem-Hingham Shipyard, Inc., in Hingham, Massachusetts, on 6 October 1943 and launched on 20 November 1943. She was transferred to the United Kingdom upon completion on 14 January 1944.

Service history

Commissioned into service in the Royal Navy  as the frigate HMS Tyler (K567) on 14 January 1944 simultaneously with her transfer, the ship was assigned to patrol and escort duty in the English Channel and also supported the invasion of Normandy in the summer of 1944.

During 1945, Tyler alternated between escort duty in the North Atlantic Ocean and patrols and escort missions in the English Channel. On 21 January 1945, she picked up the sole survivor of the Norwegian merchant ship Galatea, which the German submarine U-1051 had torpedoed and sunk off Bardsey Island in St. George's Channel in position .

After the end of World War II, Tyler steamed to the United States, arriving at the Philadelphia Naval Shipyard in Philadelphia, Pennsylvania, on 31 October 1945. The Royal Navy formally returned her to the U.S. Navy on 12 November 1945.

Disposal
The U.S. Navy struck Tyler from its Naval Vessel Register on 8 January 1946. She was sold on 23 May 1946 for scrapping to Hugo Neu of New York City and later resold to the Northern Metal Company of Philadelphia. She was scrapped in the summer of 1946.

References

Navsource Online: Destroyer Escort Photo Archive Tyler (DE-567) HMS Torrington (K-576)
uboat.net HMS Tyler (K 576)
Destroyer Escort Sailors Association DEs for UK
Captain Class Frigate Association HMS Tyler K576 (DE 567)

External links
Photo gallery of HMS Tyler (K576)

 

Captain-class frigates
Buckley-class destroyer escorts
World War II frigates of the United Kingdom
Ships built in Hingham, Massachusetts
1943 ships